The Bronze Cross Medal is the highest award for gallantry that the Scout Association can bestow on adult and child members of the movement.

The medal can also be awarded posthumously, as in the case of London Scout Frank Davis who was 17 when killed in World War II whilst serving in Civil Defence.

The medal is senior to the Silver Cross, Gilt Cross and Cornwell Scout Badge.

See also
UK Scout awards

References

Scout and Guide awards
The Scout Association